The following is a glossary of terms that are specific to anime and manga. Anime includes animated series, films and videos, while manga includes graphic novels, drawings and related artwork.

Note: Japanese words that are used in general (e.g. oniisan, kawaii and senpai) are not included on this list, unless a description with a reference for notability can be provided that shows how they relate.

Character traits
 : Refers to any noticeable strand of hair which sticks in a different direction from the rest of an anime/manga character’s hair.
 : Beautiful young woman.
 : Japanese aesthetic concept of the ideally beautiful young man:  androgynous, effeminate or gender-ambiguous. In Japan, it refers to youth with such characteristics, while in Europe and the Americas, it has become a generic term for attractively androgynous males of all ages.
 : typically used to describe early teens who have delusions of grandeur and have convinced themselves they have hidden knowledge or secret powers.
 : A stock love interest who is quiet and asocial. They are afraid to talk, fearing that what they say will get them in trouble.
They may entertain wild fantasies and persecutory delusions or other strong beliefs, and their speech or actions may seem strange or incoherent to outside observers.
 : An umbrella term for all words with the suffix; i.e. any stock character, usually female, who is distinguished by interacting with their love interest in a certain way. Several entries on this list are examples.
 : A cute girl who tends to be clumsy. They may make mistakes that hurt themselves or others. Dojikko character traits are often used for stock characters in anime and manga series.
 : A character who relentlessly pursues their own vision of their love interest's desires, which they typically misunderstand in some comically over-the-top fashion.
 : Characters with animal features such as ears and a tail, but a human body. One of the most common types is the catgirl.
 : A stock love interest who is calm and collected on the outside, and never panics. They show little emotion, and in extreme cases are completely emotionless, but may be hiding their true emotions. They tend to be leaders who are always in charge of a situation.
 : a man who has a culturally feminine gender expression, which includes amongst others a feminine appearance, or cross-dressing.
 : A stock love interest who is usually harsh, stern, cold or hostile to the person they like, while occasionally letting slip the warm and loving feelings hidden inside due to being shy, nervous, insecure or simply unable to help acting badly in front of the person they like.
 : A term for a person who is initially loving and caring to someone they like a lot until their romantic love, admiration and devotion becomes feisty and mentally destructive in nature through either overprotectiveness, violence, brutality or all three combined. Yandere characters are mentally unstable, deranged, and use violence or emotional abuse as an outlet for their emotions. Yandere are usually, but not always, female characters.

Demographics
 : Anime and manga intended for the adult female demographic.
  or : Anime and manga for children.
 : Anime and manga intended for the adult male demographic.
 : Anime and manga intended for the adolescent female demographic.
 : Anime and manga intended for the adolescent male demographic.

Fandom

 : A slang term for the parodic use of anime characters by fans, a portmanteau of "anime" and "parody".
 : One of the largest trade fairs for dōjinshi comics, held twice a year in Ariake, Tokyo.
 : A fan-made or amateurly produced work such as a parody, fan fiction or manga.
 fandub: Short for fan-made dub, describing a film or video in which fans have voiced over the dialogue.
 fansub: Short for fan-made subtitles, describing a film or video in which fans have translated and subtitled the dialogue into another language.
 : A male fan of yaoi.
 : A female fan of yaoi.
 : Appeared in the early 1980s and describes the perception that two-dimensional anime, manga, and light novel characters are more attractive visually, physically or emotionally than people from the real world, or that a person is solely sexually aroused by 2D characters.
 Odagiri effect: A television phenomenon in which a program attracts a larger than expected number of women viewers because the program stars attractive male actors or characters.
 : The literal translation of the word is another person's house or family ( otaku). In Japanese slang, otaku is mostly equivalent to "geek" or "nerd", but in a more derogatory manner than used in the West. In 1989, the word "otaku" was shunned in relation to anime and manga after Tsutomu Miyazaki (dubbed "The Otaku Murderer") brutally killed underage girls. Since then, the word has become less negative in Japan with more people identifying themselves as some type of an otaku.
  / husbando: A fictional character from non-live-action visual media (typically an anime, manga or video game) to whom one is attracted or whom one considers their ideal significant other.
 weeaboo (also weeb): A derogatory slang term for an obnoxious fan of Japanese culture, originally a replacement word for "wapanese" (a contraction of "wannabe" Japanese or "white" Japanese)

Genres

 : A genre of pornographic media focusing on the depiction of women with large breasts. With regards to bra size, bakunyū are said to be above a G75 bra size but below an M70.
 : A masculine gay men's culture and, in manga circles, a genre of manga about beefcakey gay men usually by gay men. Compare with the female-created Boys' Love. Also known as 
 : Abbreviated "BL", male homosexual content generally aimed at women, currently in general use in Japan to cover yaoi and shōnen-ai.
 harem: A subgenre of anime and manga characterized by an ordinary guy surrounded by a group of women with some being potential love interests. An ordinary girl surrounded by guys is a reverse harem.
 : A subgenre of manga and anime in which characters are transported or reincarnated into an alternate world, often with a high fantasy setting.
 : a sub-genre of slice of life, portraying characters living out peaceful lives in calming environments, which is intended to have a healing effect on the audience.
 : Portmanteau for "lolita complex". A genre of manga and anime in which childlike female characters are depicted in an erotic manner.
 mecha: anime and manga that feature robots (mecha) in battle. Series that feature mecha are divided into two subgenres: "super robots", where the mecha have unrealistic powers and the focus is more on the fighting and robots themselves, and "real robots", where the mecha have more realistic powers and there is more drama and focus on the mecha's pilots.
 : Manga or anime that focus on romances between women.
 : A term denoting male homosexual content in women's media, although this usage is obsolete in Japan. English-speakers frequently use it for material without explicit sex, in anime, manga and related fan fiction. In Japan, it denotes ephebophilia.
 : A genre of manga and anime wherein childlike male characters are depicted in an erotic manner.
 : Anime or manga with a focus on homosexual male relationships and/or male-on-male sexual content; usually created by women for women.
 : Anime or manga with a focus on lesbian relationships.  In Japan, the term denotes a broad spectrum of attraction between women. It is also used for sexually explicit content outside Japan, and is more explicit than shojo-ai.

Other terms

 anime music video (AMV): Video clips from at least one anime series arranged to fit a musical piece playing in the background.
 CV: Character Voice, see Seiyu.
 dub: When the voices in an anime are translated into another language. 
 : A scene or illustration used to begin and end a commercial break in a Japanese TV program, similar to commercial bumpers in the United States.
Eroge originated from galge that added adult content rated 18+.
 : Elements specifically included to sexually amuse (such as scantily-clad or naked males or females, or ecchi content) or titillate the audience, which may or may not be necessary to plot development.
 : This is a type of Japanese video game centered around interactions with attractive anime-style girls. These games are a subgenre of dating sims targeted towards a male audience.
 : A term adopted by more serious Japanese cartoonists, who did not want their work to be associated with manga. It is akin to English speakers who prefer the term "graphic novel", as opposed to "comic book".
 : A term used by derivative works to credit the original creator of a series. It is also used to refer to the writer of a manga, as opposed to its illustrator.
 guro: A type of anime, manga or game which includes violence, torture and sometimes death of the character. The purpose of the violence is to increase pleasure of the audience, reader or player who likes that kind of genre. Sometimes it's also synonymous with the hentai phrase, ero guro.
 : The action of a character transforming into a superhero form. Mostly used by the Kamen Riders in the Kamen Rider Series, this term ended being used for anything related to metamorphosis in manga, anime and tokusatsu, since Kamen Rider ended being mainly a tokusatsu series, despite its roots being the works of the manga artist Shotaro Ishinomori.
 : A term used outside of Japan to describe erotic or pornographic manga and anime. In Japan, terms such as "ero manga" and "ero anime" are used to describe the genre.
 : A manga or text story with male homosexual themes written for women in an  style, named so because of the Juné magazine.
 :  When a person slaps or leans against the wall and the other person has nowhere to go. This has become popular as a "clever move of confession"
 : Derived from the hentai anthology series , the term is used to refer to material with explicit sexual content.
 : Manga artist. A creator of manga; this can refer to both the writer and illustrator of the work.
 : A manga scene, usually one single image, spread to cover two opposing pages.
 : A rough draft of a proposed manga. Also known as a manga storyboard.
 : An add-on bonus to anime and manga, like a regular "extra" on western DVDs; or a bonus strip at the end of a manga chapter or volume.
 original net animation (ONA): An anime production intended to be distributed through the internet via streaming or direct download, as opposed to on TV or cinemas.
 : A video game that is targeted towards a female market, where one of the main goals, besides the plot goal, is to develop a romantic relationship between the player character (a female) and one of several male characters.
 original video animation (OVA): A type of anime which is intended to be distributed on VHS tapes or DVDs and not shown in movies or on television. It is also less frequently referred to as original animated video (OAV). DVDs are sometimes known as Original Animated DVD (OAD).
 raw: Anime episode or manga scans in its original language without editing or subtitles.
 , portmanteau: ; : a Japanese term for a sexual complex. This fetish revolves around a victim, almost exclusively a female, being physically assaulted or psychologically abused by an offender. It differs from sadism in that it is a voyeuristic fantasy fetish with focus towards fictional characters from video games, anime, manga, television and movies that include battering, abusing or otherwise killing women. In case the victim is male it is often labeled as gyaku-ryona (逆リョナ).
 scanlation (also scanslation): The scanning, translation and editing of comics from one language into another.
 : A Japanese voice actor. As well as voicing characters in anime, seiyū do voicing for video games, radio shows, drama CDs, and other media.
 : Refers to the full-page illustration that marks the beginning of most manga chapters. Designed to capture the reader's attention, they sometimes spread to cover two opposing pages, and typically contain the series' title and the chapter's title. The equivalent in American comics is the splash page.
 : Refers to manga drawn in a four-panel comic strip format.
 : Refers to the area of exposed thigh when a girl is wearing a short skirt and thigh-high socks. The ideal skirt:thigh:sock-above-knee ratio is often reported to be 4:1:2.5. Zettai ryōiki are often referred to by letter grades, where grade A is the ideal.

See also
 Japanese fashion
 Japanese honorifics
 Japanese subcultures
 Manga iconography
 List of English words of Japanese origin

References

Citations

General sources

Further reading

External links

 Anime Terminology Lexicon at Animeph.com – a large list of English and Japanese terms
 Anime News Network's Lexicon
 pixiv Encyclopedia - The Dictionary of Doujin/Manga/Illustration/Derivative Works  at pixiv

 
Japanese vocabulary
Anime and manga
Wikipedia glossaries using unordered lists